Sarah Blake is an American writer from Philadelphia, Pennsylvania. Her debut novel, Naamah, is a retelling of the Great Flood and the family's time on the ark. Her poetry books include Mr. West and Let's Not Live on Earth, as well as the chapbook Named After Death. She received a Literature Fellowship from the NEA in 2013.

Life 
Blake grew up in New Jersey. She attended The College of New Jersey as an undergraduate majoring in math and minoring in creative writing. She later received her MA in creative writing at the University of Texas at Austin, and her MFA in poetry from Pennsylvania State University. She currently lives outside London.

Career 
Blake has worked for the Geraldine R. Dodge Foundation and Princeton Day School. She also co-created the website Submittrs an online submission tracking tool for writers. In an editorial capacity, Blake was worked with Philadelphia publisher Saturnalia Books and MiPOesias.

The New York Times described Naamah as a "very wild and superbly intelligent reimagining" of the Biblical story and a "21st-century riff on climate disaster."

Honors 
2013 NEA Literature Fellowship
2019 National Jewish Book Award Winner, Goldberg Prize for Debut Fiction

Published works

Poetry

 Mr. West (Wesleyan University Press, 2015) 
 Named After Death (Banango Editions, 2016)
 Let's Not Live on Earth (Wesleyan University Press, 2017)

Fiction

 Naamah (Riverhead Books, 2019) 
 Clean Air (Algonquin Books, 2022)

References

21st-century American women writers
American women novelists
Living people
21st-century American poets
American women poets
National Endowment for the Arts Fellows
Poets from New Jersey
1984 births